Greely High School is a public high school for grades 9 to 12 located in Cumberland, Maine, United States. The enrollment is approximately 715 students. It also has a professional teaching staff of 64 and 50% of the teachers have advanced degrees. Greely High School is a part of Maine School Administrative District 51, which serves the towns of Cumberland and North Yarmouth. Renovated and added onto over the years, the building originally opened in 1868. The school completed a 10-million-dollar addition/renovation in 2009. Another addition completed in 2018 added a new auditorium to the school. It adopted the International Baccalaureate (IB) program in 2009.

History
Greely was founded in 1868 with money granted in the will of Eliphalet and Elizabeth Greely. Greely was originally private and known as the Greely Institute until a 1953 town meeting voted to make it a free school.

Notable alumni

 Hanley Denning - Founder of Charity Safe Passage/Camino Segura
 Ben True - Professional runner

Seal

References

External links
 Greely High School website

Public high schools in Maine
High schools in Cumberland County, Maine
Cumberland, Maine